Sarab (also Romanized as Sarāb and Serab) is a village in Golabar Rural District, in the Central District of Ijrud County, Zanjan Province, Iran. At the 2006 census, its population was 54, in 13 families.

References 

Populated places in Ijrud County